USS Juneau (CL-52) was a United States Navy  light cruiser sunk at the Naval Battle of Guadalcanal 13 November 1942. In total, 687 men, including the 5 Sullivan brothers, were killed in action as a result of her sinking.
She was laid down by Federal Shipbuilding Company, Kearny, New Jersey, on 27 May 1940, launched on 25 October 1941, sponsored by Mrs. Harry I. Lucas, wife of the mayor of the city of Juneau, Alaska, and commissioned on 14 February 1942, with Captain Lyman K. Swenson in command. She was torpedoed and sank on 13 November 1942, with only 10 survivors rescued after 8 days in the water. To honor the five Sullivan brothers, who all died in the sinking, and the Juneau, the Navy later commissioned two ships named The Sullivans and two ships named Juneau.

Service history

After a hurried shakedown cruise along the Atlantic Coast in the spring of 1942, Juneau assumed blockade patrol in early May off Martinique and Guadeloupe Islands to prevent the escape of Vichy French naval units. She returned to New York to complete alterations and operated in the North Atlantic and Caribbean from 1 June to 12 August on patrol and escort duties. The cruiser departed for the Pacific Theater on 22 August.

Pacific theater
The following day, TF 17, which included , combined with Admiral Noyes' unit to form TF 61, whose mission was to ferry fighter aircraft to Guadalcanal. Juneau and screen destroyers rescued 1,910 survivors of Wasp and returned them to Espiritu Santo, New Hebrides, on 16 September. The next day, the fast cruiser rejoined TF 17. Operating with the Hornet group, she supported three actions that repelled enemy thrusts at Guadalcanal: the Buin-Faisi-Tonolai Raid; the Battle of the Santa Cruz Islands; and the Naval Battle of Guadalcanal (Third Savo).

Battle of the Santa Cruz Islands

The ship's first major action was the Battle of the Santa Cruz Islands on 26 October. On 24 October, 's task force had combined with 's group to reform TF 61 under the command of Rear Admiral Thomas C. Kinkaid. This force positioned itself north of the Santa Cruz Islands to intercept enemy units that might attempt to close Guadalcanal. Meanwhile, on Guadalcanal, the Japanese achieved a breakthrough during the Battle for Henderson Field on the night of 25 October. That success evidently was a signal for Japanese ships to approach the island.

Early on the morning of 26 October, U.S. carrier planes spotted the Japanese force and immediately attacked it, damaging two carriers (CVL  and CV ), one heavy cruiser (CA ) and two destroyers, but while American aircraft were locating and engaging the enemy, American ships were also under fire. Shortly after 10:00, some 27 enemy aircraft attacked Hornet. Though Juneau and other screen ships threw up an effective anti-aircraft (AA) barrage which shot down about 20 of the attackers, Hornet was badly damaged and sank the next day. Just before noon, Juneau left Hornets escort for the beleaguered Enterprise group several miles away. Juneau helped repel four Japanese attacks that lost 18 planes.

That evening, the American forces retired to the southeast. Although the battle had been costly, it had, combined with the Marine victory on Guadalcanal, turned back the attempted Japanese parry in the Solomons. Furthermore, the damaging of two Japanese carriers sharply reduced their air power in the subsequent battle of Guadalcanal.

Naval Battle of Guadalcanal
On 8 November, Juneau departed Nouméa, New Caledonia, as a unit of TF 67 under the command of Rear Admiral Richmond K. Turner to escort reinforcements to Guadalcanal. The force arrived there early morning on 12 November, and Juneau took up her station in the protective screen around the transports and cargo vessels. Unloading proceeded unmolested until 14:05, when 30 Japanese planes attacked the alerted United States group. The AA fire was effective, and Juneau alone accounted for six enemy torpedo bombers shot down. The few remaining Japanese planes were, in turn, attacked by American fighters; only one bomber escaped. Later in the day, an American attack group of cruisers and destroyers cleared Guadalcanal on reports that a large enemy surface force was headed for the island. At 01:48 on 13 November, Rear Admiral Daniel J. Callaghan's relatively small landing support group engaged the enemy. The Japanese force consisted of two battleships, one light cruiser, and nine destroyers.

Because of bad weather and confused communications, the battle occurred in near-pitch darkness and at almost point-blank range, as the ships of the two sides became intermingled. Before noon on 13 November, Juneau, along with two other cruisers damaged in the battle— and —headed toward Espiritu Santo for repairs. Juneau was steaming on one screw, keeping station 800 yd (730 m) off the starboard quarter of the likewise severely damaged San Francisco. She was down  by the bow, but able to maintain 13 kn (15 mph, 24 km/h).

These were intended for San Francisco, but both passed ahead of her. One struck Juneau in the same place that had been hit during the battle. There was a great explosion; Juneau broke in two and disappeared in just 20 seconds. Fearing more attacks from I-26, and wrongly assuming from the massive explosion that there were no survivors, Helena and San Francisco departed without attempting to rescue any survivors. In fact, more than 100 sailors had survived the sinking of Juneau. They were left to fend for themselves in the open ocean for eight days before rescue aircraft belatedly arrived. While awaiting rescue, all but 10 died from the elements and shark attacks. Among those lost were the five Sullivan brothers. Two of the brothers apparently survived the sinking, only to die in the water; two presumably went down with the ship. Some reports indicate the fifth brother also survived the sinking, but disappeared during the first night when he left a raft and got into the water. On 20 November 1942,  recovered two of the ten survivors. One of the survivors recovered by Ballard said he had been with one of the Sullivan brothers for several days after the sinking.

Wreck
The wreck of Juneau was located on 17 March 2018 by Paul Allen's research crew on board RV Petrel.

Awards
Juneau received four battle stars for her service in World War II.

See also
 List of U.S. Navy losses in World War II, for other Navy ships lost in World War II
 , a U.S. Navy destroyer named in honor of the Sullivan brothers
 List by death toll of ships sunk by submarines

References

External links

 
 hazegray.org: USS Juneau
 uboat.net: USS Juneau
 Roll of Honor

 

Atlanta-class cruisers
World War II cruisers of the United States
Ships built in Kearny, New Jersey
World War II shipwrecks in the Pacific Ocean
Ships sunk by Japanese submarines
1941 ships
Maritime incidents in November 1942
Shipwreck discoveries by Paul Allen
2018 archaeological discoveries
Naval magazine explosions